Ambient is the dystopian debut novel of cyberpunk writer Jack Womack, the first in his Dryco series. Published in 1987, it was translated into Slovak by Michal Hvorecký, and has a significant cult following. Actor Bruce Willis optioned the novel, and renewed the option in 1995 (thus enabling Womack to quit his "day job").

References

1987 American novels
1987 science fiction novels
Debut science fiction novels
Novels by Jack Womack
Cyberpunk novels
Dryco series
Dystopian novels
Weidenfeld & Nicolson books
1987 debut novels